Dario Kreiker (born 7 January 2003) is an Austrian professional footballer who plays as a midfielder for Austria Wien.

Career
Kreiker is a youth product of Bad Vöslau, Admira Wacker, Rapid Wien, and AKA Burgenland. He began his senior career with the reserves of Wiener Neustädt in 2019, before a stint with the sixth division side Ortmann before leaving in 2021 after COVID-19 ended the season early. He moved to the reserves of Austria Wien in 2021. He was promoted to their senior team in January 2022.  He made his senior debut with Austria Wien in a 2–0 Austrian Football Bundesliga win over Hartberg on 19 February 2022. He signed his first professional contract with the club on 22 March 2022.

Personal life 
Kreiker's father Mario was also a professional footballer in Austria.

References

External links
 
 OEFB Profile

2003 births
Living people
Footballers from Vienna
Austrian footballers
Austria youth international footballers
FK Austria Wien players
SC Wiener Neustadt players
Austrian Football Bundesliga players
2. Liga (Austria) players
Austrian Regionalliga players
Association football midfielders